The Worshipful Company of Innholders is one of the 110 livery companies of the City of London.

The innholders were originally known as hostellers, but their name had changed by the time it was incorporated under a royal charter in 1514. The company has, over the years, lost its status as an association of traders and businessmen, instead becoming, as have most of the other livery companies, an establishment dedicated primarily to charity.

The Innholders' Company ranks 32nd in the order of precedence of all the livery companies. Its motto is Hinc Spes Affulget, Latin for Hence Hope Shines Forth, and it is based at Innholders' Hall in College Street, between Cannon Street and Upper Thames Street.

Gallery

See also
Licensed Trade Charity

External links
The Innholders' Company

Innholders
1514 establishments in England
Grade II* listed livery halls